Yagya Bahadur Budha Chhetri is a Nepali politician of Nepali Congress and Minister for Social Development in Karnali government since 5 June 2021. He is also serving as member of the Karnali Province Provincial Assembly. 

Chhetri was elected to the 2017 provincial assembly elections from proportional list of the party. He including one other ministers from Nepali Congress saved incumbent cabinet in vote of confidence. He joined Mahendra Bahadur Shahi cabinet on 5 June 2021 after a group of CPN (UML) withdrew support from the government. As a result of talks between the two parties Congress joined the government with two ministries. Currently, he is minister in Nepali Congress led Jeevan Bahadur Shahi.

References 

Living people
Nepali Congress politicians from Karnali Province
Year of birth missing (living people)

Provincial cabinet ministers of Nepal
Members of the Provincial Assembly of Karnali Province